This is a list of events in Scottish television from 1996.

Events

January to May
No events.

June
 Scottish launches a new political programme, called Platform.

July
Scottish Television acquires Caledonian Publishing, publishers of The Herald and Glasgow Evening Times.

August
No events.

September
No events.

October
6 October – Scottish Television launches a new set of idents

November
1 November – Launch of the satellite television channel Sky Scottish.
22 November – After nearly four year on air, Scottish Gaelic learners' television programmeSpeaking our Language ends after 72 episodes.

December
No events.

Television series
Scotsport (1957–2008)
Reporting Scotland (1968–1983; 1984–present)
Top Club (1971–1998)
Scotland Today (1972–2009)
Sportscene (1975–present)
The Beechgrove Garden (1978–present)
Grampian Today (1980–2009)
High Road (1980–2003)
Taggart (1983–2010)
Crossfire (1984–2004)
Wheel of Fortune (1988–2001)
Fun House (1989–1999)
Win, Lose or Draw (1990–2004)
Hurricanes (1993–1997)
Machair (1993–1999)
Telefios (1993–2000)
Only an Excuse? (1993–2020)
Hamish Macbeth (1995–1997)

Ending this year
22 November - Speaking our Language (1993–1996)
20 December - Doctor Finlay (1993–1996)
Unknown - Wolf It (1993–1996)

See also
1996 in Scotland

References

 
Television in Scotland by year
1990s in Scottish television